Borys Antonenko-Davydovych, born Borys Davydov was a Ukrainian writer, translator and linguist. During the Great Purge he was sentenced to the death penalty, which was later replaced with ten years jail in a gulag. Antonenko-Davydovych wrote a number of prose books; he had been translating from German and Russian. One of the most famous of his works is "How do we speak" (Як ми говоримо) in which typical mistakes of Ukrainian speakers made under the influence of Russian language are considered.

Sources 
 Юрій Лавріненко. Розстріляне відродження: Антологія 1917–1933. — Київ: Смолоскип, 2004.

External links
 

1899 births
1984 deaths
People from Sumy Oblast
People from Romensky Uyezd
Ukrainian writers
Soviet writers
Prisoners sentenced to death by the Soviet Union
Bamlag detainees
Ukrainian people of the Ukrainian–Soviet War
Male touring cyclists
Ukrainian victims of human rights abuses